Lucas Sullivant (September 22, 1765 – August 28, 1823), was the founder of Franklinton, Ohio, the first American settlement near the Scioto River in central Ohio.

Biography
Lucas Sullivant was of Irish descent; the original family name was of the ancient surname Ó Súilleabháin of southwestern Ireland.

In 1795 Lucas Sullivant was employed by the Commonwealth of Virginia to survey the Central Ohio portion of the Virginia Military District. Sullivant, along with approximately 20 men surveyed the western side of the Scioto River at the confluence of the Olentangy and Scioto Rivers. As payment for his work, Sullivant was given 6000 acres. 
Sullivant, after surveying the land, returned to Kentucky where he courted Sarah Starling, the daughter of his mentor Colonel William Starling. In 1797, Sullivant returned to the Ohio and laid out a village of 220 lots in Franklin County, which he named Franklinton in honor of the recently deceased Benjamin Franklin.  This original settlement was abandoned a year later in 1798 when a flood submerged most of the town. Sullivant relocated the town less than a mile away, off of the banks of the Scioto River.  He also served as the first Recorder of Franklin County, Ohio from 1804 to 1807.

The replatted town was laid out in blocks that contained four lots in a square, with each lot measuring 99’ wide by 115’ deep. To encourage people to move to the new settlement, Sullivant offered free land for anyone willing to build a house along Gift Street, near the eastern edge of his plat. Along with platting and settling the town, Sullivant also built several structures out of brick and glass from Philadelphia. These buildings included a courthouse, a brick home to impress Starling (who was wed to Sullivant in 1801), a brick church and the first bridge across the Scioto River.

Personal life
Lucas Sullivant married Sarah Starling, the daughter of Sullivant's mentor.  They had four children, William Starling, Michael, Joseph, and Sarah Ann.  Lucas died on August 28, 1823 and was buried at the Old Franklinton Cemetery. He was later reburied at Green Lawn Cemetery in Columbus, Ohio.

See also
 Celebration of Life (Tibor)
 Lucas Sullivant House
 Statue of Lucas Sullivant, Genoa Park

References

Further reading

1765 births
American people of Irish descent
1823 deaths
American surveyors
Burials at Green Lawn Cemetery (Columbus, Ohio)